The 2000 Atatürk Cup was a single football match contested between Turkish domestic cup winners and rivals Beşiktaş J.K. and Galatasaray S.K. Beşiktaş won the game 2-1. This was the fourth and final edition of the Atatürk Cup.

Match details

References 

Atatürk Cup
Atatürk Cup
Beşiktaş J.K. matches
Galatasaray S.K. (football) matches